Microeuraphia depressa is a species of star barnacle in the family Chthamalidae. This species has previously been classified in the genera Chthamalus and Euraphia.

References

External links

 

Barnacles